The PGA Philanthropy Tournament was a professional golf tournament that was held in Japan from 1991 to 2000. It was an event on the Japan Golf Tour and played at several different courses throughout Japan.

Winners

Notes

References

External links
Coverage on Japan Golf Tour's official site

Former Japan Golf Tour events
Defunct golf tournaments in Japan
Recurring sporting events established in 1991
Recurring sporting events disestablished in 2000